The Far Eastern Republic, sometimes called the Chita Republic, was a nominally independent state that existed from April 1920 to November 1922 in the easternmost part of the Russian Far East. Although theoretically independent, it largely came under the control of the Russian Soviet Federative Socialist Republic (RSFSR), which envisaged it as a buffer state between the RSFSR and the territories occupied by Japan during the Russian Civil War of 1917–1922. Its first president was Alexander Krasnoshchyokov.

The Far Eastern Republic occupied the territory of modern Zabaykalsky Krai, Amur Oblast, the Jewish Autonomous Oblast, Khabarovsk Krai, and Primorsky Krai of Russia (the former Transbaikal and Amur oblasts and Primorsky krai). Its capital was established at Verkhneudinsk (now Ulan-Ude), but in October 1920 it moved to Chita.

The Red Army occupied Vladivostok on 25 October 1922. Three weeks later, on 15 November 1922, the Far Eastern Republic merged with the RSFSR.

History

Establishment
The Far Eastern Republic was established in the later stages of the Russian Civil War. During the Civil War local authorities generally controlled the towns and cities of the Russian Far East, cooperating to a greater or lesser extent with the White Siberian government of Alexander Kolchak and with the succeeding invading forces of the Japanese Army. When the Japanese evacuated the Trans-Baikal and Amur oblasts in the spring of 1920, a political vacuum resulted.

A new central authority was established at Chita to govern the Far Eastern Republic remaining in the Japanese wake. The Far Eastern Republic was established comprising only the area around Verkhneudinsk, but during the summer of 1920, the Soviet government of the Amur territory agreed to join.

The Far Eastern Republic was formed two months after Kolchak's death with the tacit support of the government of Soviet Russia, which saw it as a temporary buffer state between the RSFSR and the territories occupied by Japan. Many members of the Russian Communist Party had disagreed with the decision to allow a new government in the region, believing that their approximately 4,000 members were capable of seizing power in their own right. However, Vladimir Lenin and other party leaders in Moscow felt that the approximately 70,000 Japanese and 12,000 American troops might regard such an action as a provocation, which might spur a further attack that the Soviet Republic could ill afford.

On 1 April 1920, the American Expeditionary Force, Siberia headed by General William S. Graves departed Siberia, leaving the Japanese the sole occupying power in the region with whom the Bolsheviks were forced to deal. This detail did not change the basic equation for the Bolshevik government in Moscow, however, which continued to see the establishment of a Far Eastern Republic as a sort of Treaty of Brest-Litovsk in the east, providing the regime with a necessary breathing space that would allow it to recover economically and militarily.

On 6 April 1920, a hastily convened Constituent Assembly gathered at Verkhneudinsk and proclaimed the establishment of the Far Eastern Republic. Promises were made that the republic's new constitution would guarantee free elections under the principles of universal, direct, and equal suffrage and that foreign investment in the country would be encouraged.

The Far Eastern Republic, controlled by moderate socialists, was only grudgingly recognized by the various cities of the region towards the end of 1920. Violence, atrocities, and reprisals continued to erupt periodically for the next 18 months.

Japan agreed to recognize the new buffer state in a truce with the Red Army signed 15 July 1920, effectively abandoning Ataman Grigory Semenov and his Russia Eastern Outskirts. By October Semenov had been expelled from his base of operations in Chita. With Semenov out of the picture, the capital of the Far Eastern Republic moved to that city.

On 11 November 1920 a provisional national assembly for the Far East met in Vladivostok. The gathering recognized the government at Chita and set 9 January 1921 as the date for new elections for the Constituent Assembly of the Far Eastern Republic. A new constitution closely resembling the United States Constitution was written and approved on 27 April 1921.

The 1921 coup
However, right-wing elements rejected the idea of a fledgling democratic republic in the Russian Far East. On 26 May 1921 a White coup took place in Vladivostok, backed by  Japanese occupying forces. A cordon sanitaire of Japanese troops protected the insurgents, who established a new régime,  the Provisional Government of the Priamur,
in the Primorskaya Oblast. Shortly after the coup, Kolchak's designated successor,  Ataman Semenov, arrived in Vladivostok and attempted to proclaim himself commander-in-chief—an effort which failed when his Japanese benefactors forsook him.

The new Provisional Government of the Priamur attempted—with little success—to rally the various anti-Bolshevik forces to its banner. A July 1922 Zemsky sobor deposed the Merkulov brothers and named a Russian general who had served with the Czechoslovak Legion, M.K. Dieterichs, as military dictator.

FER victory and demise, 1922 
With the Japanese exiting the country throughout the summer of 1922, panic swept through the  White Russian insurgents. The army of the Far Eastern Republic retook Vladivostok on 25 October 1922, effectively bringing the Russian Civil War to a close.

With the Civil War finally over, Soviet Russia absorbed the Far Eastern Republic on 15 November 1922. The government of the Far Eastern Republic dissolved itself and transferred all its authority and territory to the Bolshevik government in Moscow.

Aftermath 
Japan retained the northern half of Sakhalin Island until 1925, ostensibly as compensation for Nikolayevsk incident - the massacre of about 700 Japanese civilians and soldiers at Nikolaevsk-na-Amure in May-June 1920. This "compensatory" motive for holding the territory belied the fact that Japanese retaliation for the actions of Russian partisans had taken between two and three times as many Russian lives.

Territory and resources

The Far Eastern Republic consisted of four provinces of the former Russian empire—Trans-Baikal, Amur, the Maritime Province, and the northern half of Sakhalin island. Primarily, it represented the boundaries of the regions of Transbaikal and Outer Manchuria. The frontiers of the short-lived nation followed the western coastline of Lake Baikal along the northern borders of Mongolia and Manchuria to the Sea of Japan and the Sea of Okhotsk.

Of these an estimated 1.62 million were ethnic Russians and just over 1 million were of Asian extraction, with family lineages originating in China, Japan, Mongolia, and Korea.

The Far Eastern Republic was an area of substantial mineral wealth, including territory which produced about one-third of the entire Russian output of gold as well as that country's only source of domestically produced tin. Other mineral reserves of the Far Eastern Republic included zinc, iron, and coal.

The fishing industry of the former Maritime Province was substantial, with a total catch exceeding that of Iceland and featuring ample stocks of herring, salmon, and sturgeon.

Chairmen of the Government (heads of state)
Alexander Krasnoshchyokov 6 April 1920 – December 1921
Nikolay Matveyev December 1921 – 15 November 1922

Chairmen of the Council of Ministers (Prime Ministers)
Alexander Krasnoshchyokov 6 April 1920 – November 1920
Boris Shumyatsky November 1920 – April 1921
Pyotr Nikiforov 8 May 1921 – December 1921
Nikolay Matveyev December 1921 – 14 November 1922
Pyotr Kobozev 14 November 1922 – 15 November 1922

Prominent people born in the Far Eastern Republic
Yul Brynner, actor

See also

 Allied intervention in the Russian Civil War
 American Expeditionary Force,  Siberia
 Postage stamps and postal history of the Far Eastern Republic
 Outer Manchuria
 Green Ukraine
 Siberian Intervention
 Transcaucasian Socialist Federative Soviet Republic
 Priamur electoral district (Russian Constituent Assembly election, 1917)

Footnotes

Further reading
 A Short Outline of the History of the Far Eastern Republic. Washington, DC: Special Delegation of the Far Eastern Republic to the United States of America, 1922.
 Alan Wood, Russia's Frozen Frontier: A History of Siberia and the Russian Far East 1581–1991. London: A&C Black, 2011. .
 Canfield F. Smith, Vladivostok Under Red and White Rule: Revolution and Counterrevolution in the Russian Far East, 1920–1922. Seattle: University of Washington Press, 1975.
 Jamie Bisher,  White Terror: Cossack Warlords of the Trans-Siberian. London: Routledge, 2005. .
 John Albert White, The Siberian Intervention. Princeton, NJ: Princeton University Press, 1950.
 Richard K. Debo, Survival and Consolidation: The Foreign Policy of Soviet Russia, 1918–1921. Montreal/Kingston: McGill-Queen's Press, 1992. .

1922 disestablishments in Asia
Former countries in East Asia
Post–Russian Empire states
History of Primorsky Krai
Early Soviet republics
History of Manchuria
Former unrecognized countries
History of the Russian Far East
States and territories established in 1920
States and territories disestablished in 1922
Japan–Soviet Union relations
Former socialist republics
1920 establishments in Asia
Former countries of the interwar period
Far Eastern Republic